"Don't Worry 'Bout It" is a song by American hip hop recording artist 50 Cent, released on March 18, 2014 as the first single from his fifth studio album Animal Ambition (2014). The song features a guest verse by fellow American rapper Yo Gotti and was produced by Charli Brown Beatz.

Track listing 
Digital single
"Don't Worry 'Bout It"

Chart performance

References

2014 singles
2014 songs
50 Cent songs
Songs written by 50 Cent
G-Unit Records singles
Caroline Records singles
Songs written by Yo Gotti